Cyathopodium elegans is a species of soft corals in the family Clavulariidae. It is found in the western part of the Atlantic Ocean.

References

External links 

 
 

Animals described in 1936
Clavulariidae
Octocorallia genera